= Youth Sports Automation =

Online administrative platform

Youth Sports Automation is a web-based technology platform that offers administrative functions for clubs, managers and coaches which are needed to get a player on the field along with family facing capabilities for parents and players. It involves using an online management tool to organize, automate, and simplify the youth sports process — registration, payment, team formation, compliance regulatory compliance, rostering, communication, scheduling, social networking and web hosting. The overall goals are to eliminate the need to make multiple separate products work together and reduce the time teams, coaches, volunteers and families deal with administrative and communication issues.

Youth Sports Automation supports more than 45 million youth athletes playing sports in the US.
